Bagerhat-1 is a constituency represented in the Jatiya Sangsad (National Parliament) of Bangladesh since 2009 by Sheikh Helal Uddin of the Awami League.

Boundaries 
The constituency encompasses Chitalmari, Fakirhat, and Mollahat upazilas.

History 
The constituency was created in 1984 from the Khulna-1 constituency when the former Khulna District was split into three districts: Bagerhat, Khulna, and Satkhira.

Members of Parliament

Elections

Elections in the 2010s 
Sheikh Helal Uddin was re-elected unopposed in the 2014 general election after opposition parties withdrew their candidacies in a boycott of the election.

Elections in the 2000s 
Sheikh Hasina stood for three seats in the 2008 general election: Bagerhat-1, Rangpur-6, and Gopalganj-3. After winning all three, she chose to represent Gopalganj-3 and quit the other two, triggering by-elections in them. Helal Uddin was elected unopposed in March 2009 after the Election Commission disqualified the other two candidates in the by-election scheduled for April 2009.

Elections in the 1990s 
Sheikh Hasina stood for three seats in the June 1996 general election: Bagerhat-1, Khulna-1, and Gopalganj-3. After winning all three, she chose to represent Gopalganj-3 and quit the other two, triggering by-elections in them. Helal Uddin was elected in a September 1996 by-election.

References

External links
 

Parliamentary constituencies in Bangladesh
Bagerhat District